The 1977 Westminster Titans football team was an American football team that represented Westminster College of Pennsylvania as an independent during the 1977 NAIA Division II football season. In their sixth season under head coach Joe Fusco, the Titans compiled an 11–0 record. With its victory in the championship game, the Titans extended their winning streak to 20 games, the longest streak in the nation.

The Titans returned 31 lettermen from the 1976 national championship team. Paul O'Neil, Paul Rice, and Scott McLuckey were the team co-captains.

Offensive tackle Paul O'Neil was selected as a second-team player on the 1977 College Division All-America college football team. Eight Westminster players were selected as first-team players on the Pittsburgh Press' Small College All-District football team: O'Neil; quarterback Steve Kraus; split end Dave Hasson; offensive tackle Paul O'Neil, offensive guard Mark Humphrey; defensive end Dale Hoffman; defensive tackle Mark Claire; linebacker Frank Emanuele; and cornerback Steve Nelson.

Schedule

NAIA playoffs

Semifinal vs. Concord
On November 26, Westminster defeated  in the NAIA Division II semifinals by a 14–13 score at New Wilmington, Pennsylvania. Concord scored first when Lawrence Hamilton recovered a blocked punt and ran it back 40 yards for a touchdown in the first quarter. Concord missed the extra point and led, 6–0.  In the second quarter, Westminster tied the game at 6–6 when defensive back Steve Nelson intercepted a pass and returned it 43 yards for a touchdown. Westminster also missed its extra point attempt. With 9:40 remaining in the game, Concord retook the lead on a 16-yard touchdown pass from Jeff Broyles to Tony Lipscomb. The extra point was good, and Concord let, 13–6. With 5:05 remaining in the game, Westminster quarterback Steve Kraus threw a 14-yard touchdown pass to tight end John Wilkie. Rather than kick for the one-point conversion, Westminster coach Joe Fusco called for a two-point conversion. Kraus completed a pass to Dave Hassen for the victory.

Championship game at Cal Lutheran
On December 3, Westminster prevailed against undefeated , 17–9, before a crowd of 4,000 in the national championship game at Thousand Oaks, California. Cal Lutheran took a 9–0 lead in the third quarter on a pass from John Kindred to Harry Hedrick. The Titans lost their starting quarterback, Steve Kraus, to a separated shoulder in the third quarter and were also playing without its two top running backs and its top wide receiver. Sophomore halfback Frank Rondinelli led Westminster's comeback.. As he was being hit by a defender, he threw a 59-yard, wobbly touchdown pass to Bill Stiger.  Minutes later, Rondinelli ran 37 yards up the middle for the game-winning touchdown. Westminster also intercepted three passes off Cal Lutheran quarterback Kindred.

References

Westminster
Westminster Titans football seasons
NAIA Football National Champions
College football undefeated seasons
Westminster Titans football